Amhara Media Corporation (የአማራ ሚዲያ ኮርፖሬሽን) Acronym: AMC or formerly known as Amhara Mass Media Agency is a television, radio and newspaper news organisation owned by the Amhara Region government in Ethiopia. AMC was established in 1993. During 2017–2020, AMC had about 400–500 employees.

Creation
Amhara Mass Media Agency was created in 1993 with the aim of promoting development, peace and democratisation.

In 2020 the media organization was renamed Amhara Media Corporation.

Components
Amhara TV is owned by AMMA.

Political stance
In 2020, AMC was seen as tending to favour the interests of the Amhara Region government and to be independent from federal state media. The Addis Ababa branch of AMMA, created in 2016, was seen as promoting the interests of the Amhara Region and of people of Amharan ethnicity, supporting Eskinder Nega.

Similar to other major regional media in Ethiopia, AMMA has used victimisation, presenting cases of Amharans as victims, and externalisation, in which incidents in the Amhara Region are blamed on actors from other regions, omitting other perspectives.

In 2019, AMC was supportive of the newly created Prosperity Party.

Programs
In 2010, AMC created a program, "Yeketemoch Mederek" (Cities' Forum), involved public discussion forums between local officials and the public and broadcasts of material from the forums. The forums were generally seen positively by the public and as having an influence on improving local governance.

References

External links
 

Mass media in Ethiopia